Eumeces algeriensis, commonly called the Algerian skink, Algerian orange-tailed skink, Berber's skink, in French eumece d'Algérie, or in Spanish bulán, is a species of skink in the family Scincidae.  The species is endemic to the Maghreb region of North Africa.

Geographic range
E. algeriensis is found in Algeria and Morocco (including the Spanish exclave Melilla).

Habitat
The natural habitats of E. algeriensis are temperate forests, Mediterranean-type shrubby vegetation, temperate grassland, sandy shores, arable land, pastureland, plantations, and rural gardens.

Reproduction
E. algeriensis is oviparous.

References

Further reading
Boulenger GA (1887). Catalogue of the Lizards in the British Museum (Natural History). Second Edition. Volume III. ... Scincidæ ... London: Trustees of the British Museum (Natural History). (Taylor and Francis, printers). xii + 575 pp. + Plates I-XL. (Eumeces algeriensis, pp. 384–385).
Caputo V, Odierna G, Aprea G, Capriglione T (1993). "Eumeces algeriensis - a full species of the Eumeces schneiderii group (Scincidae) - karyological and morphological evidence". Amphibia-Reptilia 14 (2): 187–193.
Griffith H, Ngo A, Murphy RW (2000). "A cladistic evaluation of the cosmopolitan genus Eumeces Wiegmann (Reptilia, Squamata, Scincidae)". Russ. J. Herpetol. 7 (1): 1–16.  
Peters W (1864). "Die Eidechsenfamilie der Scincoiden, insbesondere über die Schneider'schen, Wiegmann'schen und neue Arten des zoologischen Museums". Monatsberichte der Königlichen Preussische Akademie der Wissenschaften zu Berlin 1864: 44–58. (Eumeces pavimentatus var. algeriensis, new species, p. 49). (in German).
Schleich HH, Kästle W, Kabisch K (1996). Amphibians and Reptiles of North Africa. Koenigstein, Germany: Koeltz. 627 pp.
Schmitz, Andreas; Mausfeld, Patrick; Embert, Dirk (2004). "Molecular studies on the genus Eumeces Wiegmann, 1834: phylogenetic relationships and taxonomic implications". Hamadryad 28 (1-2): 73–89.

External links
Picture of Eumeces algeriensis
Picture of Eumeces schneideri

Eumeces
Skinks of Africa
Reptiles described in 1864
Taxa named by Wilhelm Peters
Taxonomy articles created by Polbot